Below is a complete list of High Sheriffs of Tyne and Wear since the creation of that county in 1974.

1974–2000
1974–1975: Fuller Mansfield Osborn, CBE, of 9 Furzefield Road, Gosforth, Newcastle upon Tyne
1975–1976: John Macaulay Hamilton Ross, of 1 Beresford Park, Sunderland
1976–1977: Robert Arthur Stuart Sisterson, of 22 Westfield Drive, Gosforth, Newcastle upon Tyne
1977–1978: Thomas Anthony Greenwell, of Witton House, West Park Road, Cleadon, Sunderland
1978–1979: Colonel George Brown, OBE, TD, of 9 West Dene Drive, North Shields
1979–1980: Robert Harvey Dunford, TD, of Flat 7, Howard House, North Avenue, Newcastle upon Tyne
1980–1981: Captain John Darley Farrow, OBE, RN (Rtd.), of Fatfield House, Fatfield, Washington
1981–1982: Nicholas Johnson Robinson, of 42 The Grove, Gosforth, Newcastle upon Tyne
1982–1983: Robert Hackworth Chapman, of 25 Moor Crescent, Gosforth, Newcastle upon Tyne
1983–1984: Mary Dobson, of Wildwoods, Orchard Road, Rowlands Gill
1984–1985: David Cowley Souter, VRD, of 4 Chatsworth, Moor Crescent, Gosforth, Newcastle upon Tyne
1985–1986: Austen Ian Welch, OBE, of 1 Millview Drive, Tynemouth, North Shields
1986–1987: Frederick Wilson Hoult, of Stavros, 43 The Grove, Gosforth, Newcastle upon Tyne
1987–1988: Michael Francis Pyman, of Dursley, Fencer Hill Park, Gosforth, Newcastle upon Tyne
1988–1989: Roy Irvine Stewart, CBE, of Brockenhurst, 2 The Broadway, Tynemouth
1989–1990: Douglas Smith, of Flat 3, Dene Grange, Lindisfarne Road, Jesmond, Newcastle upon Tyne
1990–1991: Nigel Sherlock, of 14 North Avenue, Gosforth, Newcastle upon Tyne
1991–1992: Malcolm James Scott, of Appleby House, Saltwell Road South, Gateshead
1992–1993: Hugh Goundry Brown, of Heatherlea, 12 Lindisfarne Road, Jesmond, Newcastle upon Tyne
1993–1994: Sir David Robert Macgowan Chapman, 3rd Baronet
1994–1995: Roger Charlton Spoor, OBE, RD, of 5 Graham Park Road, Gosforth, Newcastle upon Tyne
1995–1996: Alan William Lillington, of 30 Barnes View, Sunderland
1996–1997: Michael Litster Fisher, TD, of 13 The Grove, Gosforth, Newcastle upon Tyne
1997–1998: Sylvia Margaret Murray, CBE, 35 North Ridge, Whitley Bay
1998–1999: John Streeton Ward, OBE, Eastfields, 5 Eastfields, Whitburn, Sunderland
1999–2000: Michael Bird, Stone Cutters, Church Road, Northumberland

2000 to present
2000–2001: John Teasdale Ward, 92 Kenton Road, Gosforth, Newcastle upon Tyne
2001–2002: Ann Darling, Hartside, 6 Whitburn Road, Cleadon, near Sunderland
2002–2003: Gitika Banerjee, 9 Bainbridge Holme Close, Sunderland
2003–2004: James Robertson Graeme Wright, 10 Montagu Avenue, Gosforth, Newcastle upon Tyne
2004–2005: Sir Neville Guthrie Trotter, One Kingsland, Jesmond, Newcastle upon Tyne
2005–2006: Margaret Appleby
2006–2007: Marjorie Barton
2007–2008: The Honourable Nigel Alistair Westwood
2008–2009: John Squires, OBE of Riding Mill
2009–2010: Gavin MacFarlane Black of Stamfordham 
2010–2011: Susan Margaret Winfield OBE of Middle Herrington
2011–2012: Geoffry Mark Hodgson of Newcastle upon Tyne
2012–2013: Ashley J G Winter of Hexham
2013–2014: George Scott of Newcastle Upon Tyne 
2014–2015: Ruth Thompson of Cleadon Village, Sunderland
2015–2016: Lucy Winskell
2016–2017: John D Mowbray of Fulwell, Sunderland
2017–2018: Lieutenant General Robin Vaughan Brims (Rtd) CB CBE DSO of Dalton, Newcastle upon Tyne.
2018–2019: Paul Michael Callaghan CBE of Sunderland
2019–2020: Mrs Catherine Lorna Moran OBE of Jesmond, Newcastle upon Tyne
2020–2021: Mrs Sarah Lesley Stewart OBE of Gosforth, Newcastle upon Tyne
2021–2022:
2022–2023: David Wilson Bavaird
2023–2024: Dame Irene Lucas-Hays, DBE

References

 
Tyne and Wear
Local government in Tyne and Wear
High Sheriff